Kwon Eun-bin (born January 6, 2000), known simply as Eunbin or Eunbean, is a South Korean singer and actress. She participated in the first season of Produce 101 (2016), before being eliminated in the penultimate episode. She debuted as a member of the South Korean girl group CLC in February 2016 with the release of the group's third EP Refresh. She made her acting debut in the television series Bad Papa (2018) and has since appeared in series including Top Management (2018), At a Distance, Spring Is Green (2021), Dear. M (2022) and the upcoming Duty After School (2023).

Early life and education
Kwon Eun-bin was born on January 6, 2000, in Seoul. Her father is a photojournalist. She attended Wonmyong Elementary School, Yangji Elementary School, Onham Middle School, and Hanlim Multi Art School.

Career

2016: Produce 101 

On January 22, 2016, Kwon came in limelight when she was introduced as a contestant on a Mnet reality girl group survival show, Produce 101. Produce 101 was to produce a girl group from a pool of 101 female trainees from 46 different companies. Kwon Eun-bin represented Cube Entertainment on the Produce 101, alongside Jeon So-yeon, who later debuted as the leader of (G)I-dle, and Lee Yoon-seo, a former trainee at the company. Kwon was eliminated from the show in the tenth episode and thus did not debut as a member of the consequent group, I.O.I.

2016–2022: Career with CLC 

According to Cube Entertainment, Kwon was originally due to debut with CLC in 2015, but her debut was postponed after the release of the group's third EP was delayed. Due to Produce 101's contractual restrictions, she was unable to join the group to promote "High Heels" on music shows. The agency planned for Kwon to join promotions for "High Heels" if she was eliminated, or postpone her activities with CLC if she were to secure a top 11 ranking on Produce 101. On May 12, CLC opened their V Live channel, this was followed by a live broadcast with the whole group, including Kwon. She began full promotional activities as a member of the group with the release of Nu.Clear in May 2016. A month later, her activities with the group were temporarily paused due to health problems. Within days, she resumed her group activities after recovering.

Since her debut with CLC, Kwon has participated in six of the group's Korean EPs, both of their Japanese EPs and three of their singles. She has also contributed rap lyrics to the song, "Like That" from the group's seventh EP, Black Dress, released in February 2018.

CLC's activities were officially ended in May 2022.

2018–present: Solo activities and acting projects 
On March 21, 2018, Kwon made her runway debut, modelling for Jarrett, at the 2018 F/W Hera Seoul Fashion Week.

On June 26, 2018, it was announced that Kwon would make her debut as a television actress, playing Kim Sang-ah in the MBC drama series Bad Papa. The drama began airing in September of the same year. The same year she was also cast in the YouTube Premium web series, Top Management as the character Eun-bin (named for her), a member of the popular in-show girl group, Apple Mint.

On July 8, 2019, it was revealed that Kwon had been cast in the KBS2 drama Beautiful Love, Wonderful Life as Kim Yeon-ah. She left the role due to scheduling conflicts, prior to production.

On January 21, 2020, TV Chosun announced that Kwon would be part of the cast for the new sitcom Somehow Family. The drama began airing in March before being put on indefinite hiatus, after two episodes were aired. In March 2021, Somehow Family was confirmed to renew broadcasting on TV Chosun, from March 21, as a fully pre-filmed drama, with Kwon reprising her role as Seong Ha-neul.

In October 2020, Kwon joined the cast of series Dear. M, a spin-off of the popular Korean web drama, Love Playlist. She was cast in the role of Min Yang-hee, a first year student in the Computer Science Department at Seoyeon University. Dear. M was released in two parts on June 29, 2022 and July 6, 2022 on global streaming platforms. The series was originally slated to premiere on KBS2 on February 26, 2021, but its broadcast had been delayed indefinitely due to controversies surrounding the series' lead actress.

In February 2021, Kwon was officially announced as part of the cast the KBS2 adaptation of the webtoon, At a Distance, Spring Is Green. She was cast in the role of Wang Young-ran, a fourth year P.E. major at Myeongil University. The series ran from June 14 to July 20, 2021 on KBS2.

In February 2022, it was confirmed that Kwon would be playing a major role in TVING’s upcoming original sci-fi thriller, Duty After School, based on the webtoon of the same name. It is slated to premiere on March 31, 2023 on TVING.

Discography

Songwriting 
All credits are adapted from the Korea Music Copyright Association, unless stated otherwise.

Filmography

Television series

Television shows

Radio

Awards and nominations

References

External links

 
 
 

Living people
2000 births
Cube Entertainment artists
CLC (group) members
21st-century South Korean women singers
K-pop singers
Singers from Seoul
21st-century South Korean actresses
South Korean women rappers
South Korean female idols
South Korean television actresses
South Korean web series actresses
Produce 101 contestants
Hanlim Multi Art School alumni